Machandu's brush furred rat (Lophuromys machangui) is a species of rodent in the family Muridae. It has been recorded from the Tanzania, Zambia, Malawi, and Mozambique.

References

Lophuromys
Mammals described in 2007